Mayones Guitars & Basses, established in 1982, is a manufacturer of electric guitars and bass guitars, located in Gdańsk, Poland. They specialize in building handcrafted and custom instruments.

Basic Models

Guitars 
- Aquila

- Regius

- Duvell

- Legend

Discontinued
 Vidius
 Maestro
 Virtuoso
 Setius

Bass guitars 

- Jabba

- Caledonius

- Comodus

- Patriot

- Viking

Discontinued
 BE
 Elegance
 Prestige
 Slogan
 Victorious

Artists 
Some notable artists that use/have used Mayones instruments now and in the past:

 Aaron Marshall (Intervals)
 Acle Kahney (Tesseract)
 Adel Rouhnavaz (Acrovaya)
Alber Sanmiguel (Enki)
Anders Nyström (Katatonia & Bloodbath)
Andrew Craighan (My Dying Bride)
Andy Slade (Collapse, Echovirus)
Adam Christianson (ARCHITECTS)
Adam Zieliński (JAMUN, War Within)
Aaron Aedy (Paradise Lost)
Amadeus Awad (Amadeus Awad & Amadeus Awad's EON)
Ali Dean (ARCHITECTS)
Alex Mauric (I Vs. I)
Andy Ionescu (Taine)
Bart Hennephof (Textures)
Brian van Zwietering (Dr.Jekyll)
Cristian Giurgiu (Tableau Mort)
Daniel Antonsson (Dark Tranquillity)
Daniel Gildenlöw (Pain of Salvation)
Dennis Notebaart (Yellow)
Dmitry Porubov (Психея)
 Eric Hazebroek (Stream of Passion)
 Fiachra Kelly (Xerosun)
 Federico Malaman
Gareth Jeffs (Xerosun)
Gregor Mackintosh (Paradise Lost)
Hadrien Feraud
Hugo Markaida (Rise to Fall)
Jakob Batten (Illdisposed)
Jakub Zytecki (ex-DispersE)
Jeroen van Veen (Within Temptation)
Jil Y. Creek
Jimmy Haslip (Yellowjackets)
Jochem Jacobs (ex-Textures)
Juan Tides (Pervy Perkin)
Johan Edlund (Tiamat)
John Browne (Monuments)
Jon Schaeffer (Traverser)
Jonas Renkse (Katatonia, Bloodbath)
John Paul Jones (Led Zeppelin, Them Crooked Vultures)
Keshav Dhar (Skyharbor)
Kristoffer Gildenlöw
Lena Abé (My Dying Bride)
Leo Tomasz Dorsz (Red Seas Fire)
Leslie Jhonson
Mark Brekelmans (Selfmachine)
Michael Chirva (Tvangeste)
Misha Mansoor (Periphery)
Micael Svan (Myrah)
Mohini Dey
Niilo Sevänen (Insomnium)
Niklas Sandin (Katatonia)
Niklas Sundin (Dark Tranquillity)
Paul Jackson (T'Pau)
Per Eriksson (Katatonia & Bloodbath)
 Patrick Sheridan (Fit For An Autopsy)
Paul Notebaart (Dr.Jekyll)
Peter "PeteyG" Graves (Red Seas Fire, CAGE)
Piotr Grudziński (Riverside)
Pontus Hjelm (Dead by April)
Prashant Shah (Scribe (band))
Roger Williams
Ruud Adrianus Jolie (Within Temptation)
Ryan Siew (Solo/Polaris)
Rick Sschneider (Polaris)
Scott Kay (Voyager)
Sylvain Coudret (Soilwork, Scarve)
Shaun Murphy (The Summoned)
Sergey Mavrin (Ария)
Stephan Schultz (Stream of Passion)
Sithu Aye
Ville Friman (Insomnium)
Viacheslav Kocharin (Психея)
Thorsten Geschwandtner (Nump)
Tom Searle (Architects)
Wojtek Pilichowski (Woobie Doobie)
Wes Borland (Limp Bizkit)

References

External links
 Official website

Companies based in Gdańsk
Companies established in 1982
1982 establishments in Poland
Polish brands
Guitar manufacturing companies
Electric bass guitars by manufacturer
Musical instrument manufacturing companies of Poland